Péter Kokas (born 16 April 1946) is a Hungarian rower. He competed in the men's eight event at the 1972 Summer Olympics.

References

1946 births
Living people
Hungarian male rowers
Olympic rowers of Hungary
Rowers at the 1972 Summer Olympics
People from Bischofshofen